May Company may refer to several American businesses:

The May Department Stores Company, a defunct retail company acquired by Federated Department Stores in 2006
May Company California, a defunct California department store that merged with J. W. Robinson's to create Robinsons-May
May Company Ohio, a defunct Ohio department store which was merged into Kaufmann's

See also
May Company Building (disambiguation)